The 2010 Tuvalu A-Division was the tenth season of association football competition. The league was won by Nauti FC for the fourth consecutive time and the fifth time overall. For the 2010 season, the league was named the Funafuti League.

Clubs

References

Tuvalu A-Division seasons
Tuvalu
football